Sebastián Regueiro (born 13 September 1989 in Montevideo) is an Uruguayan footballer who currently plays as a winger for San Francisco in the Liga Panameña de Fútbol. He is the nephew of Mario Regueiro who also plays as a winger but for Lanús in Argentina.

External links

1989 births
Living people
Uruguayan footballers
Association football midfielders
C.A. Cerro players
El Tanque Sisley players
Plaza Colonia players
San Francisco F.C. players
Expatriate footballers in Panama